Dr. Panabaka Lakshmi (born 6 October 1958) is an Indian politician and Former Union Minister of State for Health and Family Welfare (2004-2009) and Union Minister of State for Textile (2009-2014). She represents the Bapatla constituency of Andhra Pradesh and was a member of the Indian National Congress in combined Andhra Pradesh. Now she is a part of Telugu Desam Party (TDP).

Personal  life
Dr. Panabaka Lakshmi was born in Kavali, Nellore (Andhra Pradesh) and married Dr. P. Krishnaiah, Ex.I.R.T.S  She has two daughters. She completed her M.A. in Public Administration from Andhra University.

Career
She was elected to the 11th, 12th, and 14th Lok Sabha from Nellore and to 15th Lok Sabha from Bapatla. She was the Minister of State in the Ministry of Health and Family Welfare (2004–09), Ministry of Petroleum and Natural Gas, and Ministry of Textiles (2009–14) in UPA Govt.

She unsuccessfully contested 2019 Lok Sabha elections from Tirupati as a TDP candidate against Balli Durga Prasad Rao of YSRCP. Now she is contesting By-elections from same Tirupati seat, which is vacant following the demise of sitting MP Balli Durga Prasad Rao.

References 

Indian National Congress politicians from Andhra Pradesh
1958 births
Living people
India MPs 2004–2009
Union ministers of state of India
Telugu politicians
Women in Andhra Pradesh politics
India MPs 2009–2014
Lok Sabha members from Andhra Pradesh
People from Nellore
Articles created or expanded during Women's History Month (India) - 2014
United Progressive Alliance candidates in the 2014 Indian general election
21st-century Indian women politicians
21st-century Indian politicians
Women union ministers of state of India
Women members of the Lok Sabha
India MPs 1996–1997
India MPs 1998–1999